Events from the year 1732 in Canada.

Incumbents
French Monarch: Louis XV
British and Irish Monarch: George II

Governors
Governor General of New France: Charles de la Boische, Marquis de Beauharnois
Colonial Governor of Louisiana: Étienne Perier
Governor of Nova Scotia: Lawrence Armstrong
Commodore-Governor of Newfoundland: Edward Falkingham

Events
 1732: Fort St. Charles, on Lake of the Woods was constructed by La Vérendrye's nephew, Christopher Dufrost de La Jemeraye and his eldest son Jean Baptiste de La Vérendrye.
 Charles-Michel Mesaiger was the first priest on Lake of the Woods and at Fort St. Charles.

Births

Deaths
Daniel d'Auger de Subercase, Governor of Acadia

Historical documents
Frenchman says Louisbourg inhabitants mostly fish cod and do little farming because they get "all Necessaries in Exchange for their Fish"

Board of Trade wants Nova Scotia governor to forward old French documents concerning Acadia that he has or can obtain

Nova Scotia lieutenant governor calls for creation of assembly, "for without some statutes this Province can never be rightly setled"

Democratic reforms to include election and fiscal support of Acadian deputies by divisions of "familys" (rather than Nova Scotia governor)

Repairs needed to Annapolis Royal fort involve foundations, barracks, ramparts, riverside bastion, glacis and palisade

Councillor Mascarene to deal with Massachusetts government in ways that don't make Nova Scotia "in the least Subordinate" to it

Canso sees mostly New England and Nova Scotia fishers sailing sloops and schooners, and English ships bringing food and lading fish

Foreign markets are getting fish of lower quality because Canso shoremen don't cure fish well and ship masters accept half-cured fish

Three Canso justices of the peace and 77 merchants complain that local military damage fishery and obstruct authority

Board of Trade "wishes" any justices of the peace for French areas of Nova Scotia be Englishmen, as all JPs must take "the regular oaths"

Nova Scotia Council rejects Bishop of Quebec's jurisdiction over province and banishes priest who implemented it

Île-Royale governor St. Ovide writes Lt. Gov. Armstrong to introduce two missionaries "whom you ask for and the Bishop of Quebec has sent"

Lt. Gov. Armstrong surveys multiple French threat in Minas and Chignecto, Louisbourg, "Cape Gaspy" and "Island of St. John"

Armstrong refuses to let Catholic church in Annapolis Royal move back upriver, as massacre "by the Indians" led to move to A.R.

Île-Royale has great fishery ("no less than 7,000 fishermen") and Louisbourg fortifications (including 122 great guns over harbour)

Six French warships (one with 60 guns) at Louisbourg "are gone to carry Jews to settle the Island of St John's in the Gut of Canso"

Armstrong writes Massachusetts governor about French sway over "most powerful" Indigenous people in Nova Scotia, asking for his help

Armstrong reminded to grant land to settlers in tandem with Surveyor of His Majesty's Woods reserving forest acreage for naval use

Request for grant of land along Minas Channel in today's Cumberland County, N.S. to settle 200 Protestants over 10 years, rent-free

Nova Scotia Council settles land dispute by applying French custom giving family members first right of refusal in land sale

Nova Scotia challenged by Indigenous people who say British conquered Annapolis only and that rent is due from Chignecto colliery

From Maine, David Dunbar reports Indigenous people complain of not receiving presents and that he has asked Armstrong for reinforcements

Dunbar details French impact in Maine, including Canadian settlement and Governor General Beauharnois commissioning Penobscot chief

Privy Council orders Dunbar to "quitt the possession" of land between Penobscot and St. Croix rivers and end settlement effort

Amendment to fishing admiral act needed to allow Newfoundland governor to curb abuses, including conflict of interest, fraud and robbery

Newfoundlanders "generally subsist on salt provisions" from Ireland and American bread, flour, and cattle (plus few of their own breed)

Fogo, Twillingate, Bonavista, and Trinity Bay people take seals in nets — and furriers have "distroyed Indians" and vice versa

"Five flakes are generally esteemed a boat's room, extending from the sea backward 230 ft.;" registering them would prevent disputes

"A due subjection" to Commission of the Peace "has not been had" and several in places without prisons "dispise" justices' authority

Poole, England wants same duty-free status for Newfoundland whale products that is given to such from Davis Strait and region

Massachusetts governor Belcher mentions "French Mohawks" visiting him with "their Motion of coming to settle in this Province"

Fort built at Crown Point by French among "artful and illicit means" they have used to encroach on New York's trade and security

French to Shawnee: "The french, ye English, ye five nations, ye Delawares and you[...]are all now In peace and unity Like Brothers"

Convicted of murdering her newborn, woman in Quebec City is sentenced to public penance and hanging, with her body "disposed of as refuse"

References

 
Canada
32